The Toronto Rock are a lacrosse team based in Toronto playing in the National Lacrosse League (NLL). The 2002 season was the 5th in franchise history and 4th as the Rock.

The Rock continued its dynasty on top of the NLL standings, finishing first in its division for the fourth straight year. The Rock beat the Washington Power in the semifinals, to advance to the championship game against the Albany Attack.  Their victory in this game gave the Rock three out of the last four championships.

Regular season

Conference standings

Game log
Reference:

Playoffs

Game log
Reference:

Player stats

Runners (Top 10)

Note: GP = Games played; G = Goals; A = Assists; Pts = Points; LB = Loose Balls; PIM = Penalty minutes

Goaltenders
Note: GP = Games played; MIN = Minutes; W = Wins; L = Losses; GA = Goals against; Sv% = Save percentage; GAA = Goals against average

Awards

Roster

See also
2002 NLL season

References

External links
 

Toronto
National Lacrosse League Champion's Cup-winning seasons
2002 in Toronto